Breedon on the Hill is a village and civil parish about  north of Ashby-de-la-Zouch in North West Leicestershire, England. The 2001 Census recorded a parish population (including Isley and Wilson) of 958 people in 404 households. The population at the 2011 census (including Isley cum Langley and Langley Priory) was  1,029 in 450 households.

Geography

A large portion of the hill has been cut away by an active quarry now operated by the Breedon Group.

On top of the hill is The Bulwarks Iron Age hill fort, within which is Breedon's historic Church of England parish church. A recent survey found considerable evidence of occupation within the southern part of the hillfort enclosure.

History
Excavation of The Bulwarks in 1946 identified occupation between about the 1st century BC and about 1st century AD.

The toponym is derived from the Celtic word bre for hill and the Old English word dun for hill. Hence in its current form the name combines three forms of the word hill. Briudun, an early spelling, has been traced from AD 731.

Medieval hagiography manuscripts record four saints buried in Breedon on the Hill. They are Friduricus, donor of the Mercian royal monastery built in Breedon during the seventh century, King Eardwulf of Northumbria, and relatively unknown Anglo-Saxon Saints Beonna of Breedon and Cotta of Breedon.

Breedon has a circular stone-built village lock-up. It is 18th-century and similar to the one in the nearby Worthington. It was used for detaining local drunks or lost cattle.

Breedon Hall is an historic building which was the ancestral home of the Curzon family.

In 1874, a branch of the Midland Railway was built through the eastern part of the parish and Tonge and Breedon railway station was built at Tonge. In 1980 British Rail closed the line and later the track was dismantled. The trackbed through the parish is now part of National Cycle Route 6.

Breedon Priory Church

The Priory Church of St Mary and St Hardulph was originally a monastery founded in about AD 676 on the site of The Bulwarks, an Iron Age hill fort. It was re-founded as an Augustinian priory early in the 12th century. Before becoming a monastery it was a hermitage.

In 1498 members of the visiting Battenberg family took mass at the church on a number of occasions.

What remains of the priory church includes a large number of Anglo-Saxon sculptures, an ornate family box pew and notable Renaissance church monuments.

Amenities
Breedon has two pubs: the Holly Bush and the Three Horseshoes. There was a third pub, The Lime Kiln, but this is now a private home.

The village has a small primary school and a post office. It did have a butcher's shop, but that closed in 2017.

Breedon has a football club, Breedon F.C.

References

Sources

Further reading

External links

Parish council website

Civil parishes in Leicestershire
North West Leicestershire District
Villages in Leicestershire